Chaoyang University of Technology (CYUT) is a university in Wufeng District, Taichung, Taiwan. Founded in 1994, originally named Chaoyang Institute of Technology. It was designated by the Ministry of Education as a University of Technology, the highest level in the technological and vocational education system within the R.O.C in 1997.

Currently, the University comprises 5 colleges and 23 departments, which offer 23 master's programs and 5 doctoral programs. There are 18,000 students currently enrolled, they are around 18,00, and faculty and staff total about 1,000. CYUT’s teachers and facilities have been recognized for excellence, and its goal is to become a large, type institution of higher learning.

List of presidents

History

Chaoyang University of Technology was founded in 1994 through the generosity of Dr. Tien-sheng Yang, the President of the Ever Fortune Group, a major R.O.C.'s conglomerate. He founded it in the  memory of his parents, and in return for the support he received throughout the years from the people and communities of central Taiwan. In 1988, he chose a site in Wufeng Township of  Taichung County (now part of Taichung City), and after six years of preparation, on April 14, 1994, it received permission from the Ministry of Education to begin accepting students as Chaoyang Institute of Technology.

In its first year, Chaoyang Institute of Technology had eight departments and over 900 students. On August 1, 1997, Chaoyang Institute of Technology was designated by the Ministry of Education as a University of Technology, the school name was officially changed to Chaoyang University of Technology. It was Taiwan's first private University of Technology.

In addition to its new designation, Chaoyang University of Technology has continued to expand, and today five colleges, twenty-two graduate schools, including five doctoral programs, twenty-two master's degree programs and twenty-two departments, as well as its Evening Division, General Education Center, Continuing Education Center, Office of Research and Development, Business Incubation Center, and College of Enterprise Innovation exist.

Special Activities

Adulthood Rite
According to Li Chi, "When men are twenty years old they should wear a hat and be given an alias. For women, they are allowed to get married, use a hair pin, and give an alias. If the women are married at the age of 15, they are allowed to use a hair pin. If they are not married, they will use a hair pin at the age of thirty." Therefore, the "hat ceremony" is an adulthood rite, which has been an important custom transmitted to us from the ancient times. For the people that have passed such ceremony, they are regarded as adults. Therefore, the adulthood rite is a very important ceremony in a person's life. In order to allow the fresh people who have reached the age of twenty to build up their responsibilities, the student union will sponsor "New Six Classical Arts Campaign – Fresh People Adulthood Rite." Hope the fresh people can pass the trials of the six classical arts (etiquette, music, archery, horse riding, calligraphy, and mathematics) as preparation for entering the stage of being an adult. In addition, hope the students can have different experiences about being a "scholar" in the traditional Chinese sense; therefore they can become "Confucian Scholars." Passing the trials of the six classical arts, which is designed for the fresh people with the traditional Confucian tradition, the President of the school the Dean of the Academic Affairs will be the host of the Adulthood Rite signifying their maturity. From the process of lighting the candles and incense, worshipping the ancestors, chanting the prayer, drinking the adulthood wine, follow each step after the ancient customs closely. In addition, every participant in the ceremony will give a brief talk telling people his/her thoughts. The ceremony is simple as well as magnificent, with a strong sense of Confucian mood. With the spirit of the six classical arts as the core, together with team spirits, aim to cultivate the students with humanistic elements, for the development complete personality, lifelong and self-oriented learning. Hope that after all the fresh people undergo this ceremony can fully understand that they are already adults. They should not spend all their time playing when they are studying far away from home. In addition, they have to listen to the teachers’ suggestions to be courageous and diligent, without being lazy. It is their time to face themselves and the society.

Labor education & work study
Labor education is a kind of education that is done with labor to serve the people, allowing the students to learn from contributing their labor. The major purpose of it is to help the students become self-motivated, diligent, loving their schools, and treasure the things we have, as well as be hardworking. In addition, expect the students to contribute to the society in which we live with a practical attitude and the sense of responsibility.

Labor Education is a compulsory course for students of the day school with zero credits. It is now categorized into "Basic Labor Education" and "Group Labor Education." For basic labor education, the students from junior or senior act as team leaders, leading the students to maintain the cleanliness of the public space on campus. In addition, they will take rotation shifts to allow them to get familiar with each corner of the campus to enhance their sense of identification.

For group labor education, the advisor will lead the students group to spend two hours in maintaining the cleanliness and tidiness of the grassland on campus through group interaction and the advisor's participation. In addition, to making the campus cleaner, it can help intensify interrelations in class. Moreover, to have the community service scheme to allow students to walk out of campus and go into the community where they live to carry out the cleaning service and offer help to minorities. Through such education, we can not only elevate the quality of the living environment but also maintain good relations with the neighborhood. The campus part-time job opportunities are opened to all the students. Priority will be given to the students with economic difficulties so that they can make their own living and study without economic stress, to complete their study without worries. For the students who like to apply for campus part-time job, they can fill out the application form at the Labor Education Section. The contents of campus part-time job include word processing, environmental maintenance, and traffic services. In addition, if there is any campus part-time job information outside the school, the Labor Education Section will announce the related information.

Colleges and Departments

Sister Universities

Asia
(mainland)
 Ningbo University
 University of Science and Technology Beijing
 Beijing Union University
 Huazhong University of Science & Technology
 Nanjing University of Technology
 Beijing Institute of Technology
 East China University of Science & Technology
 Xi'anU. of Architecture & Technology
 Tianjin University of Science and Technology
 Soochow University
 Central University of Finance and Economics
 Shanghai Second Polytechnic University
 Fujian Agriculture and Forestry University
 Wuhan University of Science and Technology City
 Shantou University
 Xiamen University of Technology
 Fujian University of Technology
 Yulin University
 Huizhou University
 Putian University
 QuanZhou Institute Of Technology
 Weifang University of Science and Technology
 Zhejiang Business Technology Institute
 Fujian Polytechnic of Information Technology
 Zhangzhou Institute of Technology
 Guangdong Lingnan Institute of Technology
 FuZhou Institute of Technology
 Fujian Forestry Vocational Technical College
 Shenzhen Polytechnic
 MinXi Vocational & Technical College
 Liming Vocational University
 Guangdong Vocational College of Foreign Language and Arts
 Fuzhou College of Foreign Studies and Trade
 Xiamen Huatian International Vocation Institute
 Silicon Lake College

 Mongolian University of Science and Technology

 University of Economics-Ho Chi Minh City
 Vietnam National University, Hanoi
 University of Technical Education Ho Chi Minh City, Vietnam
 International School-Vietnam National University, Hanoi
 Hanoi University of Business and Technology, Vietnam
 Vietnam Private Universities Association-Institute of Research and Human Resources Development
 Dai Nam University, Vietnam
 Hong Bang University
 Vietnam University of Commerce
 Foreign Trade University

 The University of Aizu
 Tokyo Metropolitan Institute of Technology

 Sunchon National University
 Cheongju University

 Ngee Ann Polytechnic

 Universiti Tunku Abdul Rahman
 Han Chiang University College of Communication
 Southern University College
 New Era University College
  Mc Orange Institute
 In-House Multimedia College
 Hanxing Academy of Journalism & Communication

  Gujarat Energy Research & Management Institute
 Multinational Business Academy, India
  Institute of Technology and Science

Americas

 Missouri University of Science and Technology
 The University of Wisconsin-Platteville
 Shenandoah University
 Michigan Technological University
 Oklahoma City University
 California State Polytechnic University, Pomona
 University of Mary Hardin-Baylor
 State University of New York, Ulster
 California State University, San Bernardino
 California State University, Fullerton
 California Polytechnic State University San Luis Obispo
 California International Business University

Europe

 Hochschule Bremen University of Applied Sciences
 Johannes Gutenberg-University Mainz

 The University of Ulster
 Newcastle University
 University of Chichester
 De Montfort University
 University of the West of Scotland
 Middlesex University

 St. John International University

Oceania

 Bond University
 Curtin University of Technology
 The University of Sydney
 University of Canberra
 Flinders University

Notable alumni
 Lin Ming-chen, Magistrate of Nantou County

See also
 List of universities in Taiwan
 Poding Memorial Library

References

External links

 Library of Chaoyang University of Technology website | (in English)

1994 establishments in Taiwan
Educational institutions established in 1994
Private universities and colleges in Taiwan
Universities and colleges in Taichung
Scientific organizations based in Taiwan
Universities and colleges in Taiwan
Technical universities and colleges in Taiwan